The  flows from Mount Unzen to the Ariake Sea in Nagasaki Prefecture, Japan.

River communities 
The river passes through or forms the boundary of the following communities:

Nagasaki Prefecture
Unzen, Minamishimabara

References 

Rivers of Nagasaki Prefecture
Rivers of Japan